HMS Cockatrice (J229) was a reciprocating engine-powered  during the Second World War.

Design and description

The ships' complement consisted of 85 officers and ratings.

The reciprocating ships had two vertical triple-expansion steam engines, each driving one shaft, using steam provided by two Admiralty three-drum boilers.

The Algerine class was armed with a QF  Mk V anti-aircraft gun and four twin-gun mounts for Oerlikon 20 mm cannon. The latter guns were in short supply when the first ships were being completed and they often got a proportion of single mounts. By 1944, single-barrel Bofors 40 mm mounts began replacing the twin 20 mm mounts on a one for one basis. All of the ships were fitted for four throwers and two rails for depth charges.

Construction and career
The ship was ordered on 15 November 1940 at the Fleming and Ferguson at Paisley, Scotland. She was laid down on 21 July 1941 and launched on 22 May 1944. The ship was commissioned on 16 October 1942.

On 6 June 1944, the ship supported the invasion force during D-Day by providing smoke screens and setting up fuel lines.

In February 1948, she returned to the UK and decommissioned on arrival. She was sold for scrap in 1963.

References

Bibliography
 
 
 Peter Elliott (1977) Allied Escort Ships of World War II. MacDonald & Janes,

External links
 

 

Algerine-class minesweepers of the Royal Navy
Ships built in Belfast
1942 ships
World War II minesweepers of the United Kingdom